Lucas Alan Cruikshank (born August 29, 1993) is an American YouTuber and actor who created the character Fred Figglehorn and the associated Fred series for his channel on the video-hosting website YouTube in late 2006. These videos are centered on Fred Figglehorn, a fictional six-year-old who has a dysfunctional home life and "anger management issues".

Early life 
Lucas Alan Cruikshank was born on August 29, 1993, and raised in Columbus, Nebraska, where he attended Lakeview High School. He is the son of Molly Jeanne (née Duffy) and Dave Alan Cruikshank. He has five sisters and two brothers.

Career

Fred 

Cruikshank, while testing character ideas, created the Fred character in a Halloween video, and uploaded it to a YouTube channel that he had started with his two cousins. Upon the success of Fred, he started a video series, and set up the Fred channel in April 2008. By April 2009, the channel had over one million subscribers, making it the first YouTube channel to do so, and the most subscribed channel at the time. In December 2009, Cruikshank filmed Fred: The Movie, which aired on Nickelodeon in September 2010. Nickelodeon created a franchise surrounding the character, and began producing the sequel in March 2011. Fred 2: Night of the Living Fred aired on October 22, 2011, also on Nickelodeon. In 2012, Fred: The Show aired, consisting of twenty-four 22-minute episodes, and a third movie called Fred 3: Camp Fred.

Sponsorship and appearances 
In the Fred series, Cruikshank promotes various products and movies. He is seen using a Zipit, as well as his own products and T-shirts. In addition to promoting his own movies and albums, Cruikshank has also promoted the movies City of Ember, Year One, and Adventures of Power, and the artist Kev Blaze, by featuring in his song "Watch How I Do This".

He made a guest appearance as both "Fred" and himself on Nickelodeon's iCarly in "iMeet Fred", which first aired on February 16, 2009.

Cruikshank appeared in the Hannah Montana episode "Come Fail Away", which aired December 6, 2009. He appeared at the 2009 Teen Choice Awards as well as the 2010 Kids' Choice Awards presenting awards to winners off-stage. In 2011, he appeared on the Cartoon Network Hall of Game Awards and in an episode of Supah Ninjas. In 2012 and 2013 he starred as the lead in the Nickelodeon television show Marvin Marvin, as an alien "teenage" boy adjusting to human life.

Other YouTube work 
Cruikshank was originally a part of JKL Productions, a group comprising twins Jon and Katie Smet and Lucas Cruikshank, their cousin. Cruikshank formally left the group and deleted his individual videos. In January 2009 he set up his own channel, called "lucas", in which he appeared as himself. Between 2013 and 2014, Cruikshank partnered with Jennifer Veal to produce a series of videos on the channel, which was renamed "Lucas and Jenny," adding to the duo's popularity. After Jenny left the channel in November 2014, Cruikshank reverted the channel name back to "lucas" and continued to release vlogs. In April 2019, Cruikshank's channel name was changed to "Lucas", and currently sees over 3 million subscribers as of 2020.

Cruikshank made an appearance on Brandon Rogers' Four Million Subscriber Freakout video after the latter gained four million subscribers as of June 2018.

Personal life 
Cruikshank came out publicly as gay in a YouTube video released August 20, 2013, saying, "I'm gay. I feel so weird saying it on camera. But my family and friends have known for like three years.
I just haven't felt the need to announce it on the Internet." Cruikshank met his current boyfriend, Australian model Matthew Fawcus, "from afar" at a gay club, and the two were introduced by fellow gay YouTuber Kingsley. The pair have been dating since March 18, 2013.

One of Lucas' brothers, Jacob, also makes videos on YouTube. They regularly collaborate on videos, and have also collaborated on a podcast.

Filmography

Internet

Films

Television

Discography

Comedy albums

Singles

Awards and nominations

References

External links 

 
 
 
 

1993 births
Living people
21st-century American comedians
21st-century American male actors
American male child actors
American male comedians
American male television actors
American male web series actors
American YouTubers
American gay actors
Gay comedians
LGBT people from Nebraska
LGBT YouTubers
Male actors from Nebraska
Male bloggers
People from Columbus, Nebraska
Video bloggers
LGBT Christians
American Christians
20th-century LGBT people
21st-century American LGBT people
Number-one YouTube channels in subscribers
American LGBT comedians